Macromotettix is an Asian genus of ground-hoppers (Orthoptera: Caelifera) in the subfamily Metrodorinae and not assigned to any tribe.

Species 
Macromotettix includes the species:

Macromotettix brachynotus Zheng, 1998
Macromotettix compactus Chopard, 1929
Macromotettix convexa Deng, Zheng & Zhan, 2010
Macromotettix guangxiensis Deng, Zheng & Wei, 2007
Macromotettix longipennis Zheng, 1998
Macromotettix longtanensis Zheng & Jiang, 2003
Macromotettix luoxiaoshanensis Zheng & Fu, 2000
Macromotettix nigritibis Zheng & Fu, 2005
Macromotettix nigritubercula Zheng & Jiang, 2006
Macromotettix qinlingensis Zheng, Wei & Li, 2009
Macromotettix quadricarinatus Bolívar, 1898 - type species (as Mazarredia quadricarinata Bolívar I)
Macromotettix serrifemoralis Zheng & Jiang, 2002
Macromotettix sokutsuensis Karny, 1915
Macromotettix solomonensis Günther, 1972
Macromotettix tianlinensis Liang & Jiang, 2004
Macromotettix tonkinensis Günther, 1939
Macromotettix torulisinota Zheng, 1998
Macromotettix wangxiangtaiensis Zheng & Ou, 2010
Macromotettix wuliangshana Zheng & Ou, 2003
Macromotettix xinganensis Zheng, Zhang & Dang, 2009
Macromotettix yaoshanensis Zheng & Jiang, 2000

References

External links 
 

Tetrigidae
Caelifera genera
Orthoptera of Indo-China